The Sunda frogmouth (Batrachostomus cornutus) is a species of bird, typically placed in the family Podargidae of the order Caprimulgiformes. Recent research suggests, however, that the old order Podargiformes should be re-established, wherein the Asian frogmouths would be placed in their own family, Batrachostomidae.

It is found in Brunei, Indonesia, and Malaysia, where it occurs on Borneo and Sumatra. Its natural habitats are subtropical or tropical moist lowland forest, subtropical or tropical mangrove forest, and subtropical or tropical moist montane forest.

References

Batrachostomus
Birds of Sumatra
Birds of Borneo
Birds described in 1822
Taxonomy articles created by Polbot